Leith Academy is a state school in Leith, Edinburgh. It currently educates around 1000 pupils and around 2,800 part-time adult learners.
Mike Irving has been head teacher since August 2017.

History
It is one of the oldest schools in Scotland, with its founding usually credited to 1560, though there are records of a Leith grammar school as early as 1521 ("maister of the gramer scule of Leith"). To begin with the school was under the control of the kirk session of South Leith Parish Church. It remained so until 1806. It is not known where the school met until 1636 when records make reference to meeting in Trinity House. The school met there until 1710 when, after a disagreement about rent, the kirk session decided to move the school to King James hospital which stood on what is now South Leith Parish churchyard.

In 1792 the kirk agreed to a purpose-built building for the school. The building, by Robert Burn, beside Leith Links, was completed in 1806. The school changed its name to Leith Academy in 1888. The Leith Links school was demolished and replaced by a new building opened in 1898. In turn, due to continued growth in the number of pupils, by 1931 a new building was required and the school on the Duke Street site was built. The Links building is now used as Leith Primary School. The Duke Street school was used as part of Queen Margaret University College and has been (2014) converted to flats. The school's current building, off Easter Road, was completed in 1991 after much campaigning by staff, students and parents.

The school was founded by South Leith Parish Church, and strong links remain to this day, with the school's annual Christmas service being held there.

Building
The current Leith Academy building was completed in May 1991. The building incorporated the design principles of "planning for change" developed by the OECD Programme on Educational Building (PEB). It features an innovative design based around a "Main Street" leading from one end of the school to the other with all departments and facilities, including a swimming pool, leading off it. The Main Street has a glass roof and is lined on either side by plants. These plants were featured on the BBC Television programme The Beechgrove Garden.

In 2016 the school played host to the BBC's The Big Questions.

Notable alumni

 Mark Bonnar, actor
 Kitch Christie, South African rugby union coach
 Frederick Coutts, General from 1963 to 1969 of the Salvation Army
 Frank Doran, British Labour MP (Aberdeen North), married to Joan Ruddock
 Leigh Griffiths, footballer
 Sir Peter Heatly CBE, Chairman from 1982 to 1990 of the Commonwealth Games Federation
 David McLetchie, politician
 Andrew McNeil, footballer
 John David McWilliam, Labour MP for Blaydon (1979–2005)
 Douglas Millings, tailor
 Suzanne Mulvey (formerly Malone) International footballer
 Prof Tom Patten CBE, Vice-Chancellor from 1980 to 1981 of Heriot-Watt University, Professor of Mechanical Engineering from 1967 to 1982, and President from 1991 to 1992 of the Institution of Mechanical Engineers
 Jamie Sives, actor
 David Torrance, journalist
 Unicorn Kid, (Oliver Sabin), musician
 Jock Wilson (1903–2008), oldest D-Day veteran
 Walter Balmer Hislop, artist

Grammar School

 John Home, minister and writer.
 Robert Jameson, naturalist and mineralogist.
 Andrew MacDonald, poet

Notable former staff

 Peter Comrie FRSE (d.1944) mathematician, Rector 1922-33
 Dr John Mackie FRSE (d.1955) maths teacher then rector, 1933-53
 J K Rowling (b.1965) bestselling author of the Harry Potter series, foreign languages teacher 1990s.
 John W Tait FRSE (1862-1932) rector for over 20 years including the First World War

References

External links
Official Leith Academy Website
Leith Academy's page on Scottish Schools Online

Secondary schools in Edinburgh
Leith